Abdul Kuddus Boyati (born 1947) is a Bangladeshi folk singer. He is often mentioned as Folk Superstar by Bangladeshi media.

Early life
Kuddus was born in 1947 at Rajibpur village, Kendua Upazila of Netrokona District during the time of the British Raj. Due to financial problem, he didn't have the opportunity to study and started music practice at the age of 11. Later, he came to Dhaka in search of work where he met Director Afzal Hossain and started his career by performing in the folk related music documentaries.

Music
Kuddus collaborated with other musicians including Kangalini Sufia, Abdur Rahman Boyati and Anusheh Anadil.

Awards
 Bijoy Dibosh Podok (1995)
 Rifles Week award (2005)
 Foundation of Saarc Writers and Literature award (2011)

References

External links
 

1947 births
Living people
Bangladeshi male musicians
Date of birth missing (living people)
People from Netrokona District